A general election was held in Mississippi on November 4, 2003, to elect to 4 year terms all members of the state legislature (122 representatives, 52 senators), the offices of Governor, Lieutenant Governor, Attorney General, State Treasurer, State Auditor, Secretary of State, Commissioner of Agriculture and Commerce, and Commissioner of Insurance, plus all three members of the Transportation Commission and all three members of the Public Service Commission.

Results for the State Legislature
All 122 representatives and all 52 senators are elected for four-year terms with no staggering of terms.  The state legislature draws up separate district map for the House of Representatives and for the Senate, usually after the U.S. Census.  There are no term-limits for members of the legislature.

Results for House of Representatives

Results for Senate

Results for Statewide Offices
According to Article 5, Sections 140-41 of the state constitution, the governor and the other seven statewide officers are elected if they receive a majority of electoral votes and a majority of the direct total popular vote.  A candidate wins an electoral vote by winning a plurality of the votes in a state house district; therefore, with there being 122 house districts, there are 122 electoral votes.  When no candidate receives both majorities, the House of Representatives decides the election between the two persons receiving the highest number of popular votes.

Governor

Incumbent Democrat Ronnie Musgrove faced Republican challenger Haley Barbour as well as the Constitution Party's John Thomas Cripps, the Green Party's Sherman Lee Dillon, and the Reform Party's Shawn O'Hara.  in 1999, Musgrove, then Lt. Gov., just barely won the gubernatorial election against Republican Mike Parker, a former U.S. Representative, with the state House of Representatives deciding the outcome due to a tie in the electoral votes (Musgrove did win 49% of the popular vote compared to 48% by Parker).
Musgrove lost his re-election bid in 2003 to Barbour after a very competitive race.

Lieutenant Governor
Amy Tuck, elected to the office in 1999 as a Democrat, had switched to the Republican Party in December 2002 after taking positions on several issues, like re-districting, that opposed the state Democratic Party's stances.  In this race, her challenger was Democratic State Senator Barbara Blackmon, who was the first black woman to run for a statewide race.  Tuck defeated Blackmon by a comfortable margin.

Attorney General
Mike Moore, a Democrat who had served four terms starting in 1988, declined to run for re-election.  Moore protégé Jim Hood faced Republican Scott Newton.  Newton ran many ads attacking Hood on being soft on crime and especially criticized Hood's handling of a rape case, while Hood focused on Newton's supposed inexperience.  Hood won convincingly over Newton.

State Treasurer
Four term Democrat Marshall Bennett resigned in early 2003 to join a New York City law firm and was replaced by Peyton Prospere who was appointed by Gov. Musgrove to complete the term.  With Prospere not seeking election in his own right, Gary Anderson ran for the Democrats.  The Republicans chose 29-year-old banker Tate Reeves.  In a very close race, Reeves bested Anderson.

State Auditor
Republican Phil Bryant, first appointed by Gov. Kirk Fordice in 1996 to fill an unexpired term and then won in 1999, easily cruised to victory over Reform Party candidate Billy Blackburn.

Secretary of State
Three term incumbent Democrat Eric Clark won with token opposition.

Commissioner of Agriculture and Commerce
Democrat Lester Spell was re-elected to a 3rd term.

Commissioner of Insurance
Democrat George Dale won an 8th term.

 
Mississippi Legislature elections